The Dublin Hills are a mountain range in Inyo County, California. The highest point in the Dublin Hills is 2,523 feet.

The Dublin Hills are in a desert region of California which is close to the town of Shoshone, California. The Dublin Gulch leads from the Dublin Hills to Shoshone.

To the south of the Dublin Hills is the town of Tecopa, which is home to 150 people. From Tecopa, one can reach the Dublin Hills by taking the Old Spanish Trail Highway and then turning right on CA 127, which runs parallel with the Hills to Shoshone.

References 

Mountain ranges of the Mojave Desert
Mountain ranges of Northern California
Mountain ranges of Inyo County, California